Organizational conflict is a recurring issue in many workplaces due to numerous factors. In the National Football League and many other professional sports organizations, internal drama between players, coaches, and executives may often be publicized by the national media. 

The 1989 Buffalo Bills, who were later nicknamed the "Bickering Bills", 1993 Houston Oilers, and 2018 Pittsburgh Steelers, whose conflict was later called "Days of our Steelers" in reference to the soap opera television series Days of Our Lives, became prominent examples of teams with widely-known internal conflict. Aside from NFL teams, widely publicized scandals or conflicts involving league executives have also occurred.

List of NFL teams affected by publicized organizational conflict or scandals
This list of NFL seasons includes teams that were negatively affected by publicized scandals or organizational conflict between their members.

League-wide issues
Racial issues faced by black quarterbacks
NFL lockout
National Football League controversies

See also
National Football League player conduct policy

References

National Football League controversies
Organizational conflict